José Heberto Félix (born June 28, 1988) is a Mexican professional baseball player for the Olmecas de Tabasco of the Mexican League. He was a mid-season all-star in the California League in 2010 and the Texas League in 2011.

Career
Felix began his career in 2007 with the Tigres de Quintana Roo of the Mexican League. He joined the Texas Rangers organization in the 2008 season. He played for the organization through the 2013 season. Felix was invited to Spring Training in 2014, but did not make the club and was released on April 10, 2014. On April 22, 2014, the Sultanes de Monterrey signed Felix. On June 26, 2015, the Sultanes traded Felix and Brandon Villarreal to the Tigres de Quintana Roo, marking his second stint with the Tigres. On May 8, 2017, Felix was traded to the Acereros de Monclova in exchange for Francisco Cordoba. On April 3, 2019, Felix signed with the Pericos de Puebla. On October 4, 2019, Felix was returned to the Acereros, but on December 10, he was traded to the Rieleros de Aguascalientes. Felix did not play in a game in 2020 due to the cancellation of the Mexican League season because of the COVID-19 pandemic. On April 23, 2022, Félix was traded to the Olmecas de Tabasco in exchange for C Gilberto Galaviz.

References

External links

1988 births
Living people
Acereros de Monclova players
Bakersfield Blaze players
Baseball players from Sinaloa
Clinton LumberKings players
Frisco RoughRiders players
Mexican expatriate baseball players in the United States
Mexican League baseball catchers
People from Guasave
Pericos de Puebla players
Rieleros de Aguascalientes players
Round Rock Express players
Sultanes de Monterrey players
Tigres de Quintana Roo players
Yaquis de Obregón players
2013 World Baseball Classic players